Preobrazhenskoye is a rural locality (a village) located in Dmitriyevo-Polyansky Selsoviet, Sharansky District, Bashkortostan, Russia. The population was 55 as of 2010. There is 1 street.

Geography 
Preobrazhenskoye is located 5 km northwest of Sharan (the district's administrative centre) by road. Dmitriyeva Polyana is the nearest rural locality.

References 

Rural localities in Sharansky District